Richard Delvy (April 20, 1942 – February 6, 2010) was an American music entrepreneur. He started in the music business as a drummer who played with The Bel-Airs and took his experience to broader appeal with The Challengers, who were in the forefront of the surf music explosion in southern California. He also worked as a composer, arranger, music manager, producer, and music publisher. He owned the rights to several iconic surf and rock songs including "Wipe Out", "Mr. Moto" (written by him with Paul Johnson), and "Chick-A-Boom (Don't Ya Jes' Love It)". He is well known as being one of the first pioneers of surf music.

Overview
Richard Delvy was a surf music pioneer. In 1960, the first band he played drums in was called The Bel-Airs, and in late 1962 he founded The Challengers. They produced a smash hit album titled Surfbeat, released in January 1963. Surfbeat took the California Sound and surf music to new levels of acceptance and remains the best selling surf album of all time. His band released 15 Challengers albums throughout the sixties as well as others recorded under different names for the US and foreign markets.

Delvy also worked as a record producer through the rest of the 60's evolving with hot rod rock, folk rock, pop, rock, and psychedelic rock music as they developed. In the early 1970s, Delvy toured as the music director for Tony Orlando and Dawn and with the teen sensation David Cassidy, star of The Partridge Family TV show. During Delvy's career, he also worked for MGM Music, Bell Records, and Carousel Records. Billboard recognized Delvy as a multi-talented music entrepreneur and promoter who had the talent to join many different attributes needed as a performer and to manage artists' output effectively.

Death and legacy
Richard Delvy died on February 6, 2010, after suffering from a long illness. He helped produce many known and unknown artists, and was involved in all aspects of the music business. He was survived by his wife Bonnie, three children, and one grandchild.

Credits (incomplete)

Bands and music 
The Outsiders
The Chambers Brothers
The Other Half
The Grateful Dead
Buzz Clifford
Peanut Butter Conspiracy
A.B. Skhy
The Surfaris
The Challengers
 The Great Scots
 The Citations
 Dick Monda
 Colours
 Formula IV
 Thom Starr & The Galaxies
 Thunder & Lightning
 Hamilton Streetcar
 The Good Guys
 The Surfriders
 The Clee-Shays
 The De-Fenders
 Daddy Dewdrop aka 
The Groovy Ghoulies

Films
The Green Slime (1968)

Television
Fat Albert and the Cosby Kids
Groovie Goolies
The Archie Show (also called The Archies)

References

External links
    Richard Delvy's IMDB page

1942 births
2010 deaths
Musicians from Bridgeport, Connecticut
American drummers
American male composers
American composers
American music managers
Record producers from California